Miklavec is a village in Međimurje County, Croatia.

References

Populated places in Međimurje County